Bethanie Mattek-Sands ( Bethanie Lynn Mattek; born March 23, 1985) is an American professional tennis player. She has won nine Grand Slam titles (five in women's doubles and four in mixed doubles), and an Olympic gold medal, and is a former world No. 1 in doubles.

In women's doubles, Mattek-Sands has won 27 career titles, including five Grand Slam titles at the 2015 Australian Open, 2015 French Open, 2016 US Open, 2017 Australian Open and 2017 French Open, all partnering Lucie Šafářová. The pair also were the runners-up of the 2016 WTA Finals. Mattek-Sands became the world No. 1 in doubles on January 9, 2017, and held the top ranking for 32 consecutive weeks.

Mattek-Sands has also found great success in mixed doubles; she won the 2012 Australian Open with and the 2015 French Open and a gold medal at the 2016 Rio Olympics. Mattek-Sands then suffered a major knee injury in 2017 that required surgery and a year away from competition to heal, but eventually came back to win the 2018 and 2019 US Open mixed doubles titles, both partnering Jamie Murray. Mattek also played World TeamTennis for the Hartford FoxForce in 2000, the Sacramento Capitals in 2006, and the New York Sportimes in 2008.

Mattek-Sands has also won five singles and three doubles titles on the ITF Women's Circuit. Her best results in singles on the WTA Tour are reaching the fourth round of two major events (Wimbledon in 2008 and the French Open in 2013), the semifinals of the tournaments in Cincinnati in 2005 and Birmingham in 2008, and the final of the Bell Challenge in 2008 and 2010. She reached a career-high singles ranking of No. 30 in the world on July 11, 2011.

In 2016, hacked documents from the World Anti-Doping Agency (WADA) revealed that Mattek-Sands had twice applied for a therapeutic-use exemption for hydrocortisone and DHEA. Both times the request was granted by the International Tennis Federation before being revoked by WADA, but an application for exemption for hydrocortisone alone was eventually approved. Mattek-Sands has refused to comment on the exemption.

Tennis career

In 1999, Mattek played her first WTA Tour event in Philadelphia where she received a wildcard into the qualifying. She lost in the first round of qualifying to Nana Miyagi. It was the only tour match of the year for Mattek. Then in 2000, she received a wildcard into qualifying at the International Players Championships in Key Biscayne but lost in the first round to Anca Barna. Later in the year, she played in her first Grand Slam event at the US Open. She was handed a wildcard into the qualifying, but she lost in the first round to Gisela Rivera.

In 2001, Mattek again received a wildcard into the qualifying at the Miami Open in Key Biscayne, Florida, but lost in the second round of the qualifications to Sandra Cacic. Mattek received direct entry into the ITF event Boynton Beach due to a wildcard. She defeated top-seeded Elena Likhovtseva in the first round and Jennifer Hopkins in the second round, but lost in the quarterfinals against Åsa Carlsson. With these successes, she rose to world No. 343 in the rankings. Mattek received direct entry into the tournament at Amelia Island, Florida thanks to a wildcard. However, she lost to fellow American Jill Craybas in the first round. Mattek next played another ITF event in the Bronx as a wildcard, but lost in the first round to Sylvia Plischke. Mattek played her first main draw as a wildcard at a Grand Slam tournament at the US Open but lost to Australia's Alicia Molik in the first round. Mattek ended the year ranked world No. 338.

2008: Wimbledon fourth round, First WTA final and top 40 in singles, top 25 in doubles

In 2008, Mattek reached a then career-high singles ranking of No. 38 on November 3, 2008, and a then career-high ranking of No. 24 in doubles. At the Grand Slam tournaments, she didn't qualify for the Australian Open, but reached the second round of the French Open and the second round of the US Open. Her best result was at Wimbledon where she reached the fourth round, claiming her first top-10 win over 2007 Wimbledon runner-up Marion Bartoli. She then lost in the round of 16 to fellow American Serena Williams.

At the LA Championships, Mattek made it to the semifinals before losing to tenth-seeded Flavia Pennetta. In November, she reached her first ever WTA tournament final at the Bell Challenge in Canada, before losing to the top seeded Nadia Petrova.

2009: Injury and comeback
In 2009, she had to pull out of the Australian Open in January with a hip injury. She later made her season debut at the Indian Wells Open and reached the second round before losing to Gisela Dulko. She also entered the doubles event with Mashona Washington, where she reached the third round. At the Wimbledon Championships, she lost in the first round to the 18th seed Samantha Stosur.

2011: Career-high singles ranking of 30, first Masters doubles final

In January 2011, Mattek-Sands got the biggest win of her career by defeating world No. 7, Francesca Schiavone. Mattek-Sands later teamed with John Isner for the US and reached the Hopman Cup final, defeating the Belgian team of Justine Henin and Ruben Bemelmans.

Her good form continued into the Hobart International, where she reached her third career WTA singles final, before losing to Jarmila Groth.

At the Australian Open, Mattek-Sands lost to qualifier Arantxa Rus in the first round. She reached the quarterfinals of the women's doubles with partner Meghann Shaughnessy, and made the semifinals of mixed doubles. Her next event was a Fed Cup tie against Belgium in Antwerp, where she lost to Yanina Wickmayer in the opening rubber, and later to Kim Clijsters.

At the indoor tournament in Paris, she advanced to her second semifinal in her third WTA event of the season. She lost to eventual champion, Petra Kvitová. Mattek-Sands and Shaughnessy then made it to the final of the doubles event without dropping a set and defeated the team of Dushevina/Makarova to win their first doubles title as a team. It was her ninth career WTA doubles title. After her success in Paris, Mattek-Sands rushed off to Dubai, where she suffered an opening round loss to Peng Shuai.

At the Indian Wells Open, she made it to the second round before losing to tenth seeded Shahar Pe'er. Pairing with Shaughnessy, the American duo made it to the doubles finals losing to Sania Mirza and Elena Vesnina. In her next tournament in Miami, Mattek-Sands lost in the second round to world No. 1, Caroline Wozniacki.

After Miami, Mattek-Sands was off to Charleston for the start of the clay-court season, where she was beaten in the second round by Elena Vesnina. In doubles, Mattek-Sands/Shaughnessy made the finals of Charleston, but were once again defeated by the team of Vesnina/Mirza. Mattek-Sands next entered a small clay event in Estoril where she was the fifth-seeded player in singles, but was then upset in the first round by Monica Niculescu.

At the Madrid Open, she caused an upset in the first round when she defeated former French Open champion Ana Ivanovic after coming back from a first-set loss at love. She eventually made it to the quarterfinals before losing to Li Na, in three sets.

Mattek-Sands faced Italy's own Flavia Pennetta in her opening-round match in Rome. She defeated Pennetta in three sets, but lost to Jarmila Gajdošová in the second round.

Mattek-Sands played in the French Open and made it to the third round, which was her best result at this Grand Slam in her career thus far, before losing to the higher-seeded as well as her good friend, Jelena Janković.

At Wimbledon, Mattek-Sands (then ranked 30th) was upset in the first round against then ranked 133rd Misaki Doi from Japan. Despite the loss, Mattek-Sands reached her career-high ranking of world No. 30 for the first time, on 11 July 2011.

She then had to withdraw from her heavily scheduled U.S. hardcourt series events due to a shoulder injury. She did try to play at the US Open, but lost to Polona Hercog in the first round. In the women's doubles competition, she acquired a new partner due to the retirement of Meghann Shaughnessy. She teamed up with Jarmila Gajdošová, and they reached the third round where they lost to the team of Huber/Raymond.

2012: First mixed-doubles Grand Slam title
Mattek-Sands started her year representing the U.S. in the 2012 Hopman Cup with Mardy Fish. She came up short in her singles matches against Wimbledon champion, Petra Kvitová of the Czech Republic and Denmark's world No. 1, Caroline Wozniacki, but beat Bulgaria's Tsvetana Pironkova in the third tie. After an early exit from the Hopman Cup, she played singles at the Hobart International, where she was a finalist, and doubles with partner Gajdošová. In singles, she lost in the second round to Sorana Cîrstea, and in doubles, she reached the semifinals, before having to retire due to a neck injury.

At the Australian Open, Mattek-Sands lost to Agnieszka Radwańska in the first round. In the doubles competition, she reached the third round with Jarmila Gajdošová, before losing to the Indian/Russian pairing of Sania Mirza and Elena Vesnina. In the mixed doubles competition, she and Romanian partner, Horia Tecău finally had their breakthrough moment, defeating title favorites, Bhuphati/Mirza in the semifinals. They then went on to win the title by defeating the team of Elena Vesnina and Leander Paes in the final.

Mattek-Sands made it through the qualifying draw at the Paris indoor tournament. In the main draw, she made it to the second round, before losing to Roberta Vinci in three sets.

Mattek-Sands started to play on the doubles circuit with Sania Mirza, with whom she had had success in the past. In only their second tournament as a team in 2012, the Indian-American duo won the Premier-level event in Brussels, Belgium. However, they could not hold on to the good form as they were upset in the first round at Roland Garros. They made it to the third round of Wimbledon, but were eliminated by the Williams sisters.

Mattek-Sands and Mirza were beaten in the first round of the WTA Tour event in Carlsbad, California by Chan Hao-ching and Chan Yung-jan.

After reaching the quarterfinal in the ITF Lexington, Mattek-Sands failed to win another main-draw match in singles. However, with Mirza in doubles, she reached the quarterfinals of Montreal and the third round of the US Open, playing eventual champions Sara Errani and Roberta Vinci to three sets.

2013: French Open fourth round in singles
Mattek-Sands received a wildcard to play in Kuala Lumpur, and justified it, as she reached the final ranked at No. 197. She lost to Karolína Plíšková, despite winning first set. At home event in Charleston, she brushed aside fellow American and that year's Australian Open semifinalist Sloane Stephens, before losing to Madison Keys in third round. At Premier event in Stuttgart, Bethanie reached semifinals as qualifier, stunning No. 7 Sara Errani and Sabine Lisicki in second round and quarterfinals, respectively. There she lost to Li Na.

At the French Open, Mattek-Sands won against the sixth seeded Li Na in the second round, beating her in three sets. Mattek-Sands was placed 61 places lower than Li, the 2011 champion, in the WTA rankings. She subsequently reached the fourth round, where she lost to Maria Kirilenko. This was her best showing at this Grand Slam in singles in her career.

After successful clay-court season, she didn't continue in that style, losing in first or second round at all tournaments. At Wimbledon she lost in first round to Angelique Kerber and to Ekaterina Makarova in second round of US Open.

2014: Multiple injuries and loss of form
At Sydney International, she qualified for tournament and then beat Eugenie Bouchard and No. 5, Agnieszka Radwańska. Both defeated players would go on to reach semifinals of first Grand Slam event of season, which made Bethanie's wins bigger. But in her quarterfinal match, she retired against Madison Keys in the first set due to lumbar spine injury.

At Australian Open, she wasn't happy with draw, as she was the first opponent of third seed Maria Sharapova, losing in two sets. At the Pattaya Open, Mattek-Sands lost in the first round to Karolína Plíšková. In Doha, she beat again Bouchard, before losing to Monica Niculescu.

After losing in first round of Miami, Bethanie underwent hip surgery. She came back on court in September, when she played in Wuhan and lost in qualifying. She qualified for the China Open, but lost in first round to another qualifier Mona Barthel in three sets. Soon the season was finished, after playing two more events without success.

2015: Australian Open & French Open doubles and mixed doubles champion

In 2015, Mattek-Sands won the Australian Open and French Open women's doubles alongside Lucie Šafářová.
She also won the 2015 French Open mixed doubles title with partner Mike Bryan.

2016: Olympic gold medalist and US Open champion
In 2016, Mattek-Sands had success in both doubles and mixed doubles.

At the Australian Open, she was unable to defend her title with Lucie Šafářová because of a bacterial infection. Mattek-Sands competed with Sabine Lisicki instead, and lost in the second round.

In March, she competed in the Indian Wells Open women's doubles event. She competed with fellow American CoCo Vandeweghe. Mattek-Sands and Vandeweghe claimed the title, defeating Julia Görges and Karolína Plíšková. Next, in Miami, Mattek-Sands (partnering with Šafářová, her regular partner again) reached the final, in which she and Šafářová won against Tímea Babos and Yaroslava Shvedova. These were Mattek-Sands' second and third Premier-Mandatory/Premier-5 titles respectively.

At the French Open, Mattek-Sands and Šafářová (the defending champions) lost in the first round to Kiki Bertens and Johanna Larsson.
In June, at Wimbledon, they had another first-round exit, losing to Daria Gavrilova and Daria Kasatkina.

At the 2016 Summer Olympics in Rio de Janeiro, Mattek-Sands became an Olympic gold medalist when she won the mixed-doubles title with Jack Sock against Venus Williams and Rajeev Ram in an all-American match-up.

Her success with Šafářová was reignited at the US Open, when the pair won the title against Caroline Garcia and Kristina Mladenovic, the No. 1 seeds. This was Mattek-Sands' third Grand Slam title with Šafářová, and third overall (in women's doubles).

Mattek-Sands and Šafářová had an excellent finish during the Asian leg, the final leg of the WTA Tour. The pair competed at the Wuhan Open, their first Premier-Mandatory/ Premier-5 tournament since May. They ended up winning the title, defeating the doubles world No. 1 and defending champion, Sania Mirza, and Barbora Strýcová. Their winning streak continued over in Beijing, where Mattek-Sands and Šafářová claimed the title again Caroline Garcia and Kristina Mladenovic. These were their fourth and fifth Premier-Mandatory/Premier-5 titles together, respectively, and their fourth and fifth titles of 2016. These victories also allowed Mattek-Sands and Šafářová to qualify for the 2016 WTA Finals. They were the fourth team to do so.

At the WTA Finals, Mattek-Sands and Šafářová defeated Tímea Babos and Yaroslava Shvedova in the quarterfinals, and their rivals Caroline Garcia and Kristina Mladenovic in the semifinals. Had the pair won in the final, Mattek-Sands would have become the WTA doubles year-end No. 1. However, the American-Czech team was defeated by Makarova and Vesnina.

2017: World No. 1 doubles ranking and second Australian and French Open title
Mattek-Sands played at the Brisbane International with Sania Mirza, the defending champion, in doubles. The duo defeated Makarova and Vesnina in the final, with Mattek-Sands succeeding Mirza as the new world No. 1 in doubles.

At the Australian Open, Mattek-Sands competed with Šafářová. The pair won their second Australian Open doubles title in three years, and their second straight Grand Slam tournament, defeating Andrea Hlaváčková and Peng Shuai in the final, in three sets.

Mattek-Sands won the French Open women's doubles title, again with Šafářová, by beating Ashleigh Barty and Casey Dellacqua, in straight sets.

Playing Sorana Cîrstea in the second round of the Wimbledon singles, Mattek-Sands was running to the net at the beginning of the third set when she collapsed in agony, clutching at her right knee. She shouted out a large number of swear words for which she later apologized. She was treated on the court before being rushed to a local hospital with an "acute knee injury" which was later revealed to be a dislocated kneecap and ruptured patellar ligament, for which surgery was required. Mattek-Sands had suffered a torn medial collateral ligament on the same knee in September 2013.

2018–20: Comeback and US Open mixed-doubles wins
In September 2018, Mattek-Sands returned to compete in the US Open mixed doubles and won the title, partnering Scotsman Jamie Murray in their first entry as a pair; it was her eighth Grand Slam doubles title overall and Murray's sixth (including the same tournament the previous year). The pair defended their title at the 2019 US Open, and ended runners-up at the 2020 Australian Open.

2021: Third French Open doubles final
Seeded 14th at the French Open, Mattek-Sands partnered previous year singles champion Iga Świątek. The pair, who were playing just their third event together, reached the final in which they were defeated by Czech duo Barbora Krejčíková/Kateřina Siniaková in straight sets.

Fashion
Mattek has achieved extensive publicity as a result of her eccentric fashion sense on the court. Notable outfits include leopard print outfits at the 2004 US Open and 2007 US Open, a striped cowboy hat that garnered her a fine at the 2005 US Open, a "soccer theme" at the 2006 Wimbledon Championships that included £10 football socks, chandelier earrings, a tube top worn over a strappy vest top, tiny running shorts and a headband, pink knee-high socks at the 2006 JPMorgan Chase Open, and a loosely draped beige top, with a crocheted waist and split sleeves that resembled a toga and beige knee-high socks at the 2006 US Open.
During the 2011 pre-Wimbledon party in London, Mattek-Sands wore a fluorescent green dress, by designer Alex Noble, that featured tennis balls as components and a Mohican-style hat.

Personal life
Mattek grew up in Minnesota and Wisconsin. On November 29, 2008, she married insurance executive Justin Sands in Naples, Florida. Since then she has used the name Mattek-Sands professionally. She lives in Phoenix, Arizona.

Significant finals

Grand Slam tournaments

Doubles: 6 (5 titles, 1 runner-up)

Mixed doubles: 6 (4 titles, 2 runner-ups)

WTA Tour Championships

Doubles: 1 (1 runner-up)

Premier Mandatory/Premier 5 tournaments

Doubles: 7 (6 titles, 1 runner-up)

Olympic Games

Mixed doubles: 1 (gold medal)

WTA career finals

Singles: 4 (4 runner-ups)

Doubles: 44 (27 titles, 17 runner-ups)

ITF Circuit finals

Singles: 9 (5–4)

Performance timelines

Only main-draw results on WTA Tour, Grand Slam tournaments, Fed Cup/Billie Jean King Cup and Olympic Games are included in win–loss records.

Singles
Current through the 2021 Indian Wells Open.

Doubles

Mixed doubles

Junior Grand Slam tournament finals

Doubles: 1 (runner-up)

Top-10 wins per season

World TeamTennis
Mattek-Sands has played three seasons with World TeamTennis, making her debut in 2000 with the Hartford FoxForce, later playing a season with the Sacramento Capitals in 2006, and the New York Sportimes in 2008. Mattek-Sands joined the Chicago Smash for their inaugural season during the 2020 WTT season at The Greenbrier. The team advanced to the final as the second seed with a win over the Orlando Storm in the semifinals, but ultimately fell in the Championship match to the New York Empire in a Supertiebreaker. Mattek-Sands was named the 2020 WTT MVP due to her doubles play throughout the season.

References

External links

 
 
 

1985 births
Living people
American female tennis players
American people of Czech descent
Sportspeople from Phoenix, Arizona
Sportspeople from Rochester, Minnesota
Tennis people from Arizona
Tennis people from Minnesota
Hopman Cup competitors
Grand Slam (tennis) champions in mixed doubles
Grand Slam (tennis) champions in women's doubles
Australian Open (tennis) champions
French Open champions
US Open (tennis) champions
Olympic gold medalists for the United States in tennis
Medalists at the 2016 Summer Olympics
Tennis players at the 2016 Summer Olympics
Olympic medalists in tennis
Tennis players at the 2020 Summer Olympics
21st-century American women
WTA number 1 ranked doubles tennis players